Aleksandar Ignjovski (born 27 January 1991) is a Serbian professional footballer who plays as a defensive midfielder or right-back for  club Holstein Kiel.

Club career
Born in Belgrade, SR Serbia, SFR Yugoslavia, Ignjovski played in his first season as senior in 2008 for the Serbian SuperLiga club OFK Beograd, playing twenty three games and scoring three goals during that season. On 8 July 2009, he was loaned to 2. Bundesliga club TSV 1860 Munich.

At the end of the loan, Ignjovski returned to Belgrade before signing for Werder Bremen. On 1 April 2014, he stated his decision not renew his contract at the club. In this time at Werder Bremen, he made 60 league appearances scoring 1 goal.

On 3 April 2014, it was announced that Ignjovski had signed a three-year contract with Eintracht Frankfurt with effect from the season 2014–15, where he was reunited with his former manager at Werder, Thomas Schaaf. He made his debut for Frankfurt 23 August 2014 in a 1–0 win against SC Freiburg.

In June 2016, Ignjovski signed for SC Freiburg. He made his league debut for Freiburg on 28 August 2016 in a 2–1 loss to Hertha Berlin being replaced by Onur Bulut in the 66th minute.

On 21 July 2019, Ignjovski joined Holstein Kiel on a two-year deal.

International career
Ignjovski was a member of Serbian U-21 team from 2009. Due to his Macedonian background, in March 2010 Macedonia national team coach Mirsad Jonuz officially stated his desire to have him play for Macedonia however this never materialised. Instead, he made his debut for the Serbia national team on 28 February 2012 in Larnaca, Cyprus, in a friendly match against Armenia.

Career statistics

Club

International

References

External links
 

1991 births
Living people
Footballers from Belgrade
Serbian people of Macedonian descent
Serbian footballers
Association football midfielders
Serbia international footballers
Serbia under-21 international footballers
OFK Beograd players
Serbian SuperLiga players
TSV 1860 Munich players
SV Werder Bremen players
Eintracht Frankfurt players
SC Freiburg players
1. FC Magdeburg players
Holstein Kiel players
Bundesliga players
2. Bundesliga players
Serbian expatriate footballers
Serbian expatriate sportspeople in Germany
Expatriate footballers in Germany